Hamlin is a city in Jones and Fisher Counties in the U.S. state of Texas. The population was 2,124 at the 2010 census, and in 2018, the estimated population was 1,997. The Jones County portion of Hamlin is part of the Abilene, Texas metropolitan area.

History
The city was named for W. H. Hamlin, a railroad official of the Kansas City, Mexico and Orient Railway. The Orient reached Hamlin in 1906 and was followed by the Texas Central Railroad within a few years and by the Abilene and Southern Railroad in 1910. The arrival of the railroad was announced in 1902, and the first train arrived in 1906. The county's first gypsum plant was constructed  outside of Hamlin in 1903. Business boomed with the rail service, and the town included gins, a cottonseed oil mill, and a number of other businesses. Oil was discovered in 1928, which also contributed to the economy. The Hamlin Herald was first published in 1906 and is still in print. Hamlin later gained its first and only hospital, Hamlin Memorial Hospital, in 1948; it is operated by Hamlin Hospital District and owns Hamlin Medical Clinic.

Geography

Hamlin is located in northwestern Jones County at  (32.886690, –100.125207). The city limits extend west into Fisher County, although no people lived in this portion as of 2010.

U.S. Route 83 passes through the center of Hamlin as Central Avenue, leading north  to Aspermont and southeast  to Anson, the Jones County seat. Texas State Highway 92 crosses Hamlin as Lake Drive, leading east  to Stamford and west 20 miles to Rotan.

Demographics

2020 census

As of the 2020 United States census, there were 1,831 people, 730 households, and 528 families residing in the city.

2000 census
As of the census of 2000,  2,248 people, 924 households, and 623 families resided in the city. The population density was 422.4 people per square mile (163.1/km). The 1,090 housing units averaged 204.8 per square mile (79.1/km). The racial makeup of the city was 79.58% White, 6.23% African American, 0.22% Native American, 0.71% Asian, 0.04% Pacific Islander, 11.48% from other races, and 1.73% from two or more races. Hispanics or Latinos of any race were 20.69% of the population.

Of the 924 households, 29.5% had children under the age of 18 living with them, 52.7% were married couples living together, 10.8% had a female householder with no husband present, and 32.5% were not families. About 31.6% of all households were made up of individuals, and 18.6% had someone living alone who was 65 years of age or older. The average household size was 2.39 and the average family size was 3.00.

In the city, the population was distributed as 25.7% under the age of 18, 6.8% from 18 to 24, 22.9% from 25 to 44, 22.7% from 45 to 64, and 21.9% who were 65 years of age or older. The median age was 41 years. For every 100 females, there were 87.3 males. For every 100 females age 18 and over, there were 78.9 males.

Males had a median income of $25,887 versus $16,350 for females. The per capita income for the city was $13,308. About 13.7% of families and 20.7% of the population were below the poverty line, including 27.6% of those under age 18 and 21.2% of those age 65 or over.

Education
The city is served by the Hamlin Independent School District and is home to the Hamlin High School Pied Pipers.

Climate
According to the Köppen climate classification system, Hamlin has a semiarid climate, BSk on climate maps.

References

Cities in Fisher County, Texas
Cities in Jones County, Texas
Cities in Texas
Cities in the Abilene metropolitan area
1907 establishments in Texas